Harry Allen Corey (March 12, 1901 – January 20, 1989) was a Canadian entrepreneur and politician. In 1924, he married Nelda Stairs, daughter of Ernest W. Stairs, a prominent Southampton, New Brunswick, farmer and a member of the Legislative Assembly of New Brunswick.

Corey entered the lumber business in his early twenties, first working in forestry in his home area in northern York County, New Brunswick before settling in Millinocket, Maine, where Great Northern Paper Company owned vast timberlands and operated the second largest newsprint mill in the state. Unusual for the time, his wife Nelda played an active role in the creation and development of the family's lumber business which led the couple to the small community of Harvey, New Brunswick, where they made their permanent home in the 1930s. Highly successful, Corey's lumber operations grew to employ more than five hundred people.

Introduced to politics by his father-in-law, in the 1944 New Brunswick general election, Corey was elected to the 40th New Brunswick Legislative Assembly as the Liberal Party's candidate for York County. He was returned to office in the 1948 election. Following his party's defeat in the 1952 election, he was voted President of the New Brunswick Liberal Association, a position he held from 1953-1959.

Corey died in 1989 and is buried in Harvey.

Antecedents
He was a fifth generation descendant of Loyalist Gideon Corey of North Kingston, Washington County, Rhode Island, who came to Canada at the peace in 1783.

He was a fifth generation descendant of Donald MacDonald, native of the Isle of Skye, who migrated to New Brunswick prior to 1790 first settling in the Moncton area and marrying Ann Smith and later moved to New Canaan, Brunswick Parish, in Queens County where he acquired and operated a grist mill and farm.

He was a sixth generation descendant through Ann Smith aforesaid to planters James and Martha Smith who arrived in the Moncton area from Philadelphia in June, 1766, having arranged to take up land granted to a Philadelphia syndicate that included Benjamin Franklin as one of the owners. James Smith is thought to have married Martha in Halifax after he arrived there with Col Cornwallis as he then was in 1749 and then, after the hostilities with the French ended in 1760, was released from further duty, hitched a ride for he and his family on a British transport or supply ship headed to the British headquarters in Philadelphia and was living there when this Moncton opportunity appeared.
He was a third cousin once removed to Richard Chapman Weldon QC, PhD (Harvard), MP, Albert County Politician and co-founder and first dean of Dalhousie Law School in Halifax through his great great grandmother Ann Smith whose sister Martha Smith married John Geldart and in time became great grandparents of Dean Weldon.

External links
 Legislative Assembly of New Brunswick
 Government of Canada Rural Partnerships Pilot Project with historical information on Harry A. Corey

1901 births
1989 deaths
Members of the United Church of Canada
Canadian businesspeople in timber
New Brunswick Liberal Association MLAs
People from York County, New Brunswick
People from Millinocket, Maine
20th-century Canadian businesspeople